Six ships of the Royal Navy have been named HMS Wizard.

 was a brig-sloop launched 1805 and sold October 1816.
 was a  launched in May 1830 and wrecked 1859.
 was a  launched in August 1860 and scrapped 1879.
 was a  launched in August 1889 and renamed HMS Karakatta in April 1890.
 was a  launched in February 1895 and sold in 1920.
 was a W-class destroyer launched in September 1943. Later converted to a Type 15 frigate and scrapped in 1967

References

Royal Navy ship names